Clothing sizes are the sizes with which garments sold off-the-shelf are labeled. Sizing systems vary based on the country and the type of garment, such as dresses, tops, skirts, and trousers. There are three approaches:

 Body dimensions: The label states the range of body measurements for which the product was designed. (For example: bike helmet label stating "head girth: 56–60 cm".)
 Product dimensions: The label states characteristic dimensions of the product. (For example: jeans label stating inner leg length of the jeans in centimetres or inches (not inner leg measurement of the intended wearer).)
 Ad hoc sizes: The label states a size number or code with no obvious relationship to any measurement. (For example: Size 12, XL.) Children's clothes sizes are sometimes described by the age of the child, or, for infants, the weight.

Traditionally, clothes have been labelled using many different ad hoc size systems, which has resulted in varying sizing methods between different manufacturers made for different countries due to changing demographics and increasing rates of obesity, a phenomenon known as vanity sizing. This results in country-specific and vendor-specific labels incurring additional costs, and can make internet or mail order difficult. Some new standards for clothing sizes being developed are therefore based on body-dimensions, such as the EN 13402 "Size designation of clothes".

History of standard clothing sizes 
Before the invention of clothing sizes in the early 1800s, all clothing was made to fit individuals by either tailors or makers of clothing in their homes. Then garment makers noticed that the range of human body dimensions was relatively small (for their demographic). Therefore, sizes were based on:
 Horizontal torso measurements, which include the neck circumference, the shoulder width, the bustline measurements – over-bust circumference, the full bust circumference, the bust-point separation, and the under-bust (rib-cage) circumference – the natural waist circumference, the upper hip circumference and the lower hip circumference. 
 Vertical torso measurements, which include the back (neck-waist) length, the shoulder-waist length (not the same as the back length, due to the slope of the shoulder), the bust-shoulder length, the bust-waist length, and the two hip-waist lengths.
  Sleeve measurements, which include the under-arm and over-arm lengths, the fore-arm length, the wrist circumference and the biceps circumference.

However, because of the drape and ease of the fabric, not all measurements are required to obtain a well-fitting apparel in most styles.

Standards

International

ISO 
There are several ISO standards for size designation of clothes, but most of them are being revised and replaced by one of the parts of ISO 8559 which closely resembles European Standard EN 13402:
 ISO 3635: 1981, Size designation of clothes – Definitions and body measurement procedure (withdrawn)
 ISO 3636: 1977, Size designation of clothes - Men's and boys outerwear garments. (withdrawn)
 ISO 3637: 1977, Size designation of clothes - Women's and girls outerwear garments. (withdrawn)
 ISO 3638: 1977, Size designation of clothes - Infants garments. (withdrawn)
 ISO 4415: 1981, Size designation of clothes - Mens and boys underwear, nightwear and shirts. (withdrawn)
 ISO 4416: 1981, Size designation of clothes - Women's and girls’ underwear, nightwear, foundation garments and shirts. (withdrawn)
 ISO 4417: 1977, Size designation of clothes - Headwear. (withdrawn)
 ISO 4418: 1978, Size designation of clothes - Gloves. (withdrawn)
 ISO 5971: 1981, Size designation of clothes - Pantyhose.
 ISO 7070: 1982, Size designation of clothes - Hosiery.
 ISO 8559: 1989, Garment construction and anthropometric surveys – Body dimensions (withdrawn)
 ISO 8559-1: 2017, Size designation of clothes — Part 1: Anthropometric definitions for body measurement
 ISO 8559-2: 2017, Size designation of clothes — Part 2: Primary and secondary dimension indicators
 ISO 8559-3: 2018, Size designation of clothes — Part 3: Methodology of the creation of the body measurement tables and intervals
 ISO/TR 10652: 1991, Standard sizing systems for clothes (withdrawn)

Asia

China 
 GB 1335-81
 GB/T 1335.1-2008 Size designation of clothes - Men
 GB/T 1335.2-2008 Size designation of clothes - Women
 GB/T 1335.3-2008 Size designation of clothes - Children
 GB/T 2668-2002 Sizes for coats, jackets and trousers
 GB/T 14304-2002 Sizes for woolen garments

Japan 
 JIS L 4001 (1997) Sizing systems for infants' garments
 JIS L 4002 (1997) Sizing systems for boys' garments
 JIS L 4003 (1997) Sizing systems for girls' garments
 JIS L 4004 (1997) Sizing systems for men's garments
 JIS L 4005 (1997) Sizing systems for women's garments
 JIS L 4006 (1997) Sizing systems for foundation garments
 JIS L 4007 (1997) Sizing systems for Hosiery and Pantyhose

South Korea 
 KS K 0050 (2009) Men's wear
 KS K 0051 (2004) Women's wear
 KS K 0052 Infants
 KS K 0059 Headgear
 KS K 0070 Brassiere
 KS K 0037 Dress Shirts
 KS K 0088 Socks

Thailand 
 Wacoal (1981, 1987)

Australia 
 L9 - Women's clothing - Apparel Manufacturers Association of NSW - 1959-1970
 AS1344-1972, 1975, 1997 Size coding scheme for women's clothing
 AS1182 - 1980 - Size coding scheme for infants and children's clothing

Europe

CEN 
The European Standards Organisation (CEN) produced a series of standards, prefixed with EN 13402:
 EN 13402-1: Terms, definitions and body measurement procedure
 EN 13402-2: Primary and secondary dimensions
 EN 13402-3: Size designation of clothes. Body measurements and intervals (2004)
 EN 13402-4: Coding system (2006)
intended to replace the existing national standards of the 33 member states.  It is currently in common use for children's clothing, but not yet for adults. The third standard EN 13402-3 seeks to address the problem of irregular or Vanity sizing through offering a SI unit based labelling system, which will ALSO pictographically describe the dimensions a garment is designed to fit, per the ISO 3635 standard.

Germany 
 DOB-Verband (1983)

France 
 AFNOR NF G 03-001 (1977) - Human body - Vocabulary - Pictogram;
 AFNOR EXP G 03-002 (1977) - Women Measures
 AFNOR EXP G 03-003 (1977) - Men Measures
 AFNOR EXP G 03-006 (1978) - Measures of babies and young children
 AFNOR EXP G 03-007 (1977) - Size designation of clothes for men, women and children
 AFNOR NF G 03-008 (1984) - Tights 
- Sizes - Designation - Marking

Russian Federation 
 GOST R 53230-2008 (ISO 4415-1981) Size designation of clothes. Men's and boy's underwear, nightwear and shirts

United Kingdom 

 BS 3666:1982 Specification for size designation of women's wear
 BS 6185:1982 Specification for size designation of men's wear
BS 3666:1982, the standard for women's clothing, is rarely followed by manufacturers as it defines sizes in terms of hip and bust measurements only within a limited range. This has resulted in variations between manufacturers and a tendency towards vanity sizing.

Former Yugoslavia 
Slovenia, Croatia, Bosnia and Herzegovina, Macedonia and Serbia still use the JUS (F.G0.001 1979, F.G0.002 1979, F.G0.003 1979) standards developed in the former Yugoslavia. In addition to typical girth measurements clothing is also marked to identify which of 5 height bands: X-Short, Short, Medium, Tall, X-Tall, and body types: Slim, Normal, or Full, it is designed to fit.

North America

United States 
 CS-151-50 - Infants, Babies, Toddlers and Children's clothing
 CS 215-58 - Women's Clothing (1958)
 PS 36-70 - Boys Clothing (1971)
 PS 42-70 Women's Clothing (1971)
 PS 45-71 - Young Men's clothing,
 PS 54-72 - Girls Clothing
 ASTM D5585-95, (2001)
 ASTM D6829-02, (2008)
 ASTM D5585-11, (2011) (withdrawn, 2020)
 ASTM D6240-98,
 ASTM D6960-04, Women's Plus sized (2004)

There is no mandatory clothing size or labeling standard in the U.S, though a series of voluntary standards have been in place since the 1930s. The U.S. government, however, did attempt to establish a system for women's clothing in 1958 when the National Bureau of Standards published "Body Measurements for the Sizing of Women's Patterns and Apparel." The guidelines of the book was made a commercial standard and was even updated in 1970. But the guide was eventually degraded to a voluntary standard until it was abolished altogether in 1983. Private organization ASTM International started to release its own recommended size carts in the 1990s.

Since then, the common US misses sizes have not had stable dimensions.  Clothing brands and manufacturers size their products according to their preferences. For example, the dimensions of two size 10 dresses from different companies, or even from the same company, may have grossly different dimensions; and both are almost certainly larger than the size 10 dimensions described in the US standard.  Vanity sizing may be partly responsible for this deviation (which began in earnest in the 1980s).

Women

Comparison tables 

Note: a Japanese dress marked 13-Y-PP or 13-Y-P would be designed for someone with an 89 cm bust and 89 cm hips, while a dress marked 13-B-T would be targeted at a taller individual with 105 cm hips, but the same 89 cm bust. The B fitting adds 12 cm and the T height modifier 4 cm to the base hip measurement 89 + 16 = 105 cm. Additionally there are a set of age based waist adjustments, such that a dress marketed at someone in their 60s may allow for a waist 9 cm larger than a dress, of the same size, marketed at someone in their 20s. The age based adjustments allow for up to a 3 cm increase in girth, per decade of life.

Italian sizes (ITA) 
Dress sizes are calculated as follows: 
 Standard dress size = (Bust Circumference cm / 2)

French sizes (FRA/BEL) 
Dress sizes are calculated as follows: 
 Standard dress size = (Bust Circumference cm / 2) - 4

German sizes (DE/AT/NL/SE/DK) 
Dress sizes are calculated as follows: 
 Standard dress size (Height 164–170 cm) = (Bust Circumference cm / 2 ) - 6
 Short dress sizes (Height <164 cm) = Standard dress size / 2
 Tall dress sizes (Height >170 cm) = Standard dress size * 2

Men

Comparison tables

French sizes (FRA/BEL) 
Chest / Suit sizes are calculated as follows:
 Standard Size Code = ( Chest Circumference cm + 1) / 2

German sizes (AT/DE/NL/DK/SE/FI) 
Chest / Suit sizes are calculated as follows:
 Standard Size Code (Normale) = ( Chest Circumference cm – 1) / 2
 Short / Stocky (Kurz / Untersetzt) = Standard Size Code / 2
 Portly (Bauchgrößen) = Standard Size Code + 1
 Tall / Lean (Schlank / Lang) = (Standard Size Code - 1) * 2

Size dividers 
Size dividers are used by clothing stores to help customers find the right size.  Like index cards, they are found on racks between sizes.  There are three basic types: the rectangular, round and the king size. Among the stores that use them are Marshalls and TJ Maxx.

See also 
 Anthropometry
 Bra size
 Bust/waist/hip measurements
 Female body shape
 Petite size
 Shoe size
 Size zero

References

External links 
 

Retail processes and techniques
 
19th-century fashion
20th-century fashion
21st-century fashion
Clothing controversies
Dresses
Fashion design